Ruben Aleksanyan (born 14 March 1990) is an Armenian weightlifter. He won a gold medal at the 2009 U23 European Championships in Władysławowo, Poland, and a silver medal at the 2010 European Championships in Minsk, Belarus. He was still under twenty years of age when he lifted a combined total of 432 kg (195 kg in the snatch and 237 kg in the clean and jerk), which was a European Under-20 record, in losing to Evgeny Chigishev. He competed at the 2016 Summer Olympics in the Men's +105 kg.

References

External links

Armenian male weightlifters
Living people
1990 births
Olympic weightlifters of Armenia
Weightlifters at the 2016 Summer Olympics
World Weightlifting Championships medalists
Sportspeople from Yerevan
European Weightlifting Championships medalists